Jeňellihatap (also Jyňňylhatap or Dzhingilkhatab) is a village in Kerki District, Lebap Province, Turkmenistan near the border with Afghanistan.

Nearby villages include Agar (2.8 nm), Gyzyl Daýhan (4.1 nm), Hatap (3.8 nm) and Çagagüzer (1.7 nm).

See also 
List of cities, towns and villages in Turkmenistan
Index of Turkmenistan-related articles

References

External links
Satellite map at Maplandia.com

Populated places in Lebap Region